Totimoshi is an American rock band based in Los Angeles, California, United States. It was founded in Oakland, California, in 1997.

Style and reception
Totimoshi are inspired by artists such as Frank Zappa and Jimi Hendrix; however, the 2008 album Milagrosa borrows more from the band Shellac. Milagrosa, a concept album and stylistic departure from the band's previous albums, is written to the themes of the battle between love and hate, according to the vocalist, Tony Aguilar. It received a 7.5/10 score on Pitchfork Media, and 3/4 from the eZine Static Multimedia.

The 2006 album Ladrón received a 3.5/5 score from Tiny Mix Tapes, and was praised for being "sophisticated" and "patently enjoyable". It was also praised by eZines such as Deaf Sparrow.

Discography

References

External links

Totimoshi at PureVolume
[ Totimoshi] at AllMusic

American alternative metal musical groups
Punk rock groups from California
Alternative rock groups from California